{{Infobox CBB Team
|current =2022–23 Alabama A&M Bulldogs basketball team
|name = Alabama A&M Bulldogs
|logo = Alabama A&M Bulldogs logo.svg
|logo_size =150
|university = Alabama A&M University
|conference = SWAC
|location = Huntsville, Alabama
|coach = Otis Hughley Jr.
|tenure = 1st
|arena = Alabama A&M Events Center
|capacity = 6,000
|nickname = Bulldogs
|NCAAchampion =
|NCAAfinalfour =
|NCAAeliteeight = D-II: 1988, 1994, 1995, 1996
|NCAAsecondround = D-II:  1988, 1994, 1995, 1996, 1997
|NCAAtourneys = D-II: 1985, 1986, 1987, 1988, 1989, 1993, 1994, 1995, 1996, 1997D-I: 2005
|conference_tournament = 
SIAC: 1975, 1976, 1986, 1987, 1988, 1989, 1993, 1995, 1996
SWAC: 2005|conference_season = SIAC: 1975, 1976, 1986, 1987, 1988, 1989, 1993, 1994, 1995, 1996
SWAC: 2005''
|h_body=600000
|h_pattern_b=_thinsidesonwhite
|h_shorts=600000
|h_pattern_s=_thinsidesonwhite
|a_body=600000
|a_pattern_b=_thinwhitesides
|a_shorts=600000
|a_pattern_s=_whitesides
}}

The Alabama A&M Bulldogs basketball team''' is the men's basketball team that represents Alabama Agricultural and Mechanical University (Alabama A&M) in Normal, Alabama.  The school's team currently competes in the Southwestern Athletic Conference (SWAC) and are led by head coach Otis Hughley Jr. Prior to the Bulldogs' move to NCAA Division I in 1998, the team was a member of the Southern Intercollegiate Athletic Conference and a consistent presence in the NCAA Division II Tournament. Notable players include Desmond Cambridge, Mickell Gladness, Obie Trotter, Frank Sillmon, Willie Hayes, and Nigel Moore. The Bulldogs were coached by L. Vann Pettaway from 1986 to 2010. During his tenure, Pettaway amassed a 440–264 record with the a school-best 28–3 in 1992–93 and 1995–96. From 1992 to 1997, the Bulldogs went 136–20.

NCAA record holders
Desmond Cambridge holds the NCAA Division I record for all-time steals in a single season, and highest steals per game average for a season. Obie Trotter is fourth all-time single season steals. Mickell Gladness is second all-time in blocks in a season. Gladness set a Division I single game record with 16 blocks against Texas Southern on February 24, 2007.  No other player in Division I history has even recorded 15 blocks in a single game.

Postseason

NCAA Division I tournament
Alabama A&M has appeared in the NCAA tournament one time, with the Bulldogs garnering a record of 0–1.

NCAA Division II tournament
Alabama A&M made ten appearances in the NCAA Division II men's basketball tournament, with the Bulldogs garnering a record of 9–10.

Notable players

Maurice Kemp (born 1991), basketball player in the Israeli Basketball Premier League

References

External links
Team website